The 2017–18 Toronto Maple Leafs season was the 101st season for the National Hockey League franchise that was established on November 22, 1917, and its 91st season since adopting the Maple Leafs name in February 1927.

The Maple Leafs posted a regular season record of 49 wins, 26 losses and 7 overtime/shootout losses for 105 points, qualifying for the Stanley Cup playoffs for the second consecutive season. They set a new franchise record in wins and wins at home. After coming back from 1-3 series, they went on to lose versus the Boston Bruins in Game Seven in the First Round.

Regular season
The Maple Leafs set a new franchise record in wins when they earned their 46th win of the season on March 28, 2018, and as well set a new franchise record for wins at home. The following day, the Leafs officially clinched a playoff spot for a second consecutive season.

The Maple Leafs had a good year against Canadian teams, with a record of 12-4-0. They won all games versus Montreal, Edmonton and Calgary. They split the series with Ottawa, Winnipeg and Vancouver.

On December 19, 2017, to mark the 100th anniversary of their first game, the Maple Leafs held a special game, branded as the "Next Century Game", in which they beat the Carolina Hurricanes 8–1. To mark the historic occasion, the team wore commemorative Toronto Arenas uniforms during the game inspired by those worn by our franchise's original namesake - the Arenas.

Standings

Record vs opponents

Notes
 Game decided in overtime
 Game decided in a shootout

Schedule and results

Preseason

|- style="background:#fcc;"
| 1 || September 18 || @ Ottawa Senators || 2–6 ||  || McElhinney || Canadian Tire Centre || 14,931 || 0–1–0 || Recap
|- style="background:#fcc;"
| 2 || September 19 || Ottawa Senators || 2–5 ||  || Kaskisuo || Air Canada Centre || 18,847 || 0–2–0 || Recap
|- style="background:#cfc;"
| 3 || September 22 || Buffalo Sabres || 3–0 ||  || – || Ricoh Coliseum || – || 1–2–0 || Recap
|- style="background:#cfc;"
| 4 || September 23 || @ Buffalo Sabres || 3–1 ||  || Kaskisuo || KeyBank Center || 17,345 || 2–2–0 || Recap
|- style="background:#cfc;"
| 5 || September 25 || Montreal Canadiens || 5–1 ||  || Andersen || Ricoh Coliseum || – || 3–2–0 || Recap
|- style="background:#cfc;"
| 6 || September 27 || @ Montreal Canadiens || 4–2 ||  || McElhinney || Videotron Centre || – || 4–2–0 || Recap
|- style="background:#cfc;"
| 7 || September 29 || @ Detroit Red Wings || 4–2 ||  || Andersen || Little Caesars Arena || 17,746 || 5–2–0 || Recap
|- style="background:#ffc;"
| 8 || September 30 || Detroit Red Wings || 2–3 || SO || McElhinney || Ricoh Coliseum || – || 5–2–1 ||Recap
|-

Regular season

|- style="background:#cfc;"
| 1 || October 4 || @ Winnipeg Jets || 7–2 || || Andersen (1–0–0) || Bell MTS Place || 15,321 || 1–0–0 || 2 || Recap
|- style="background:#cfc;"
| 2 || October 7 || New York Rangers || 8–5 || || Andersen (2–0–0) || Air Canada Centre || 19,621|| 2–0–0 || 4 || Recap
|- style="background:#cfc;"
| 3 || October 9 || Chicago Blackhawks || 4–3 || OT || Andersen (3–0–0) || Air Canada Centre || 19,456 || 3–0–0 || 6 || Recap
|- style="background:#fcc;"
| 4 || October 11 || New Jersey Devils || 3–6 || || Andersen (3–1–0) || Air Canada Centre || 19,103 || 3–1–0 || 6 || Recap
|- style="background:#cfc;"
| 5 || October 14 || @ Montreal Canadiens || 4–3 || OT || Andersen (4–1–0) || Bell Centre || 21,302 || 4–1–0 || 8 || Recap
|- style="background:#cfc;"
| 6 || October 17 || @ Washington Capitals || 2–0 || || Andersen (5–1–0) || Capital One Arena || 18,506 || 5–1–0 || 10 || Recap
|- style="background:#cfc;"
| 7 || October 18 || Detroit Red Wings || 6–3 || || McElhinney (1–0–0) || Air Canada Centre || 19,158 || 6–1–0 || 12 || Recap
|- style="background:#fcc;"
| 8 || October 21 || @ Ottawa Senators || 3–6 || || Andersen (5–2–0) || Canadian Tire Centre || 17,455 || 6–2–0 || 12 || Recap
|- style="background:#cfc;"
| 9 || October 23 || Los Angeles Kings || 3–2 || || Andersen (6–2–0) || Air Canada Centre || 19,235 || 7–2–0 || 14 || Recap
|- style="background:#fcc;"
| 10 || October 26 || Carolina Hurricanes || 3–6 || || Andersen (6–3–0) || Air Canada Centre || 19,070 || 7–3–0 || 14 || Recap
|- style="background:#fcc;"
| 11 || October 28 || Philadelphia Flyers || 2–4 || || Andersen (6–4–0) || Air Canada Centre || 19,317 || 7–4–0 || 14 || Recap
|- style="background:#fcc;"
| 12 || October 30 || @ San Jose Sharks || 2–3 || || Andersen (6–5–0) || SAP Center || 17,562 || 7–5–0 || 14 || Recap
|-

|- style="background:#cfc;"
| 13 || November 1 || @ Anaheim Ducks || 3–1 || || Andersen (7–5–0) || Honda Center || 15,628 || 8–5–0 || 16 || Recap
|- style="background:#fcc;"
| 14 || November 2 || @ Los Angeles Kings || 3–5 || || McElhinney (1–1–0) || Staples Center || 18,230 || 8–6–0 || 16 || Recap
|- style="background:#fcc;"
| 15 || November 4 || @ St. Louis Blues || 4–6 || || Andersen (7–6–0) || Scottrade Center || 19,046 || 8–7–0 || 16 || Recap
|- style="background:#cfc;"
| 16 || November 6 || Vegas Golden Knights || 4–3 || SO || Andersen (8–6–0) || Air Canada Centre || 19,398 || 9–7–0 || 18 || Recap
|- style="background:#cfc;"
| 17 || November 8 || Minnesota Wild || 4–2 ||  || Andersen (9–6–0) || Air Canada Centre || 19,049 || 10–7–0 || 20 || Recap
|- style="background:#cfc;"
| 18 || November 10 || Boston Bruins || 3–2 || OT || Andersen (10–6–0) || Air Canada Centre || 19,381 || 11–7–0 || 22 || Recap
|- style="background:#cfc;"
| 19 || November 11 || @ Boston Bruins|| 4–1 || || McElhinney (2–1–0) || TD Garden || 17,565 || 12–7–0 || 24 || Recap
|- style="background:#cfc;"
| 20 || November 16 || New Jersey Devils || 1–0 || OT || Andersen (11–6–0) || Air Canada Centre || 19,202 || 13–7–0 || 26 || Recap
|- style="background:#cfc;"
| 21 || November 18 || @ Montreal Canadiens || 6–0 || || Andersen (12–6–0) || Bell Centre || 21,302 || 14–7–0 || 28 || Recap
|- style="background:#fcc;"
| 22 || November 20 || Arizona Coyotes || 1–4 || || Andersen (12–7–0) || Air Canada Centre || 19,196 || 14–8–0 || 28 ||Recap
|- style="background:#ffc;"
| 23 || November 22 || @ Florida Panthers || 1–2 || SO || Andersen (12–7–1) || BB&T Center || 15,256 || 14–8–1 || 29 || Recap
|- style="background:#cfc;"
| 24 || November 24 || @ Carolina Hurricanes || 5–4 || || Andersen (13–7–1) || PNC Arena || 15,241 || 15–8–1 || 31 || Recap
|- style="background:#fcc;"
| 25 || November 25 || Washington Capitals || 2–4 || || McElhinney (2–2–0) || Air Canada Centre || 19,404 || 15–9–1 || 31 || Recap
|- style="background:#cfc;"
| 26 || November 28 || @ Calgary Flames || 4–1 || || Andersen (14–7–1) || Scotiabank Saddledome || 19,289 || 16–9–1 || 33 || Recap
|- style="background:#cfc;"
| 27 || November 30 || @ Edmonton Oilers || 6–4 || || Andersen (15–7–1) || Rogers Place || 18,347 || 17–9–1 || 35 || Recap
|-

|- style="background:#fcc;"
| 28 || December 2 || @ Vancouver Canucks || 1–2 || || Andersen (15–8–1) || Rogers Arena || 18,865 || 17–10–1 || 35 || Recap
|- style="background:#cfc;"
| 29 || December 6 || Calgary Flames || 2–1 || SO || Andersen (16–8–1) || Air Canada Centre || 19,217 || 18–10–1 || 37 || Recap
|- style="background:#cfc;"
| 30 || December 9 || @ Pittsburgh Penguins || 4–3 || || Andersen (17–8–1) || PPG Paints Arena || 18,658 || 19–10–1 || 39 || Recap
|- style="background:#cfc;"
| 31 || December 10 || Edmonton Oilers || 1–0 || || McElhinney (3–2–0) || Air Canada Centre || 19,486 || 20–10–1 || 41 || Recap
|- style="background:#fcc;"
| 32 || December 12 || @ Philadelphia Flyers || 2–4 || || Andersen (17–9–1) || Wells Fargo Center || 19,077 || 20–11–1 || 41 || Recap
|- style="background:#fcc;"
| 33 || December 14 || @ Minnesota Wild || 0–2 || || Andersen (17–10–1) || Xcel Energy Center || 18,857 || 20–12–1 || 41 || Recap
|- style="background:#fcc;"
| 34 || December 15 || @ Detroit Red Wings || 1–3 || || McElhinney (3–3–0) || Little Caesars Arena || 19,515 || 20–13–1 || 41 || Recap
|- style="background:#cfc;"
| 35 || December 19 || Carolina Hurricanes || 8–1 || || Andersen (18–10–1) || Air Canada Centre || 19,288 || 21–13–1 || 43 || Recap
|- style="background:#fcc;"
| 36 || December 20 || @ Columbus Blue Jackets || 2–4 || || McElhinney (3–4–0) || Nationwide Arena || 17,708 || 21–14–1 || 43 || Recap
|- style="background:#cfc;"
| 37 || December 23 || @ New York Rangers || 3–2 || || Andersen (19–10–1) || Madison Square Garden || 18,006 || 22–14–1 || 45 || Recap
|- style="background:#cfc;"
| 38 || December 28 || @ Arizona Coyotes || 7–4 || || Andersen (20–10–1) || Gila River Arena || 17,125 || 23–14–1 || 47 || Recap
|- style="background:#ffc;"
| 39 || December 29 || @ Colorado Avalanche || 3–4 || OT || Pickard (0–0–1) || Pepsi Center || 18,013 || 23–14–2 || 48 || Recap
|- style="background:#fcc;"
| 40 || December 31 || @ Vegas Golden Knights || 3–6 || || Andersen (20–11–1) || T-Mobile Arena || 18,118 || 23–15–2 || 48 || Recap
|-

|- style="background:#fcc;"
| 41 || January 2 || Tampa Bay Lightning || 0–2 || || Andersen (20–12–1) || Air Canada Centre || 19,344 || 23–16–2 || 48 || Recap
|- style="background:#cfc;"
| 42 || January 4 || San Jose Sharks || 3–2 || SO || Andersen (21–12–1) || Air Canada Centre || 19,132 || 24–16–2 || 50 || Recap
|- style="background:#cfc;"
| 43 || January 6 || Vancouver Canucks || 3–2 || SO || Andersen (22–12–1) || Air Canada Centre || 19,361 || 25–16–2 || 52 || Recap
|- style="background:#ffc;"
| 44 || January 8 || Columbus Blue Jackets || 2–3 || OT || Andersen (22–12–2) || Air Canada Centre || 18,933 || 25–16–3 || 53 || Recap
|- style="background:#fcc;"
| 45 || January 10 || Ottawa Senators || 3–4 || || Andersen (22–13–2) || Air Canada Centre || 19,117 || 25–17–3 || 53 || Recap
|- style="background:#ffc;"
| 46 || January 16 || St. Louis Blues || 1–2 || OT || Andersen (22–13–3) || Air Canada Centre || 18,951 || 25–17–4 || 54 || Recap
|- style="background:#ffc;"
| 47 || January 18 || @ Philadelphia Flyers || 2–3 || OT || Andersen (22–13–4) || Wells Fargo Center || 19,860 || 25–17–5 || 55 || Recap
|- style="background:#cfc;"
| 48 || January 20 || @ Ottawa Senators || 4–3 || || Andersen (23–13–4) || Canadian Tire Centre || 17,768 || 26–17–5 || 57 || Recap
|- style="background:#fcc;"
| 49 || January 22 || Colorado Avalanche || 2–4 || || Andersen (23–14–4) || Air Canada Centre || 18,979 || 26–18–5 || 57 || Recap
|- style="background:#cfc;"
| 50 || January 24 || @ Chicago Blackhawks || 3–2 || OT || Andersen (24–14–4) || United Center || 21,563 || 27–18–5 || 59 || Recap
|- style="background:#cfc;"
| 51 || January 25 || @ Dallas Stars || 4–1 || || McElhinney (4–4–0) || American Airlines Center || 18,225 || 28–18–5 || 61 || Recap
|- style="background:#cfc;"
| 52 || January 31 || New York Islanders || 5–0 || || Andersen (25–14–4) || Air Canada Centre || 19,267 || 29–18–5 || 63 || Recap
|-

|- style="background:#cfc;"
| 53 || February 1 || @ New York Rangers || 4–0 || || McElhinney (5–4–0) || Madison Square Garden || 18,006 || 30–18–5 || 65 || Recap
|- style="background:#fcc;"
| 54 || February 3 || @ Boston Bruins || 1–4 || || Andersen (25–15–4) || TD Garden || 17,565 || 30–19–5 || 65 || Recap
|- style="background:#cfc;"
| 55 || February 5 || Anaheim Ducks || 7–4 || || McElhinney (6–4–0) || Air Canada Centre || 19,055 || 31–19–5 || 67 || Recap
|- style="background:#cfc;"
| 56 || February 7 || Nashville Predators || 3–2 || SO || Andersen (26–15–4) || Air Canada Centre || 18,878 || 32–19–5 || 69 || Recap
|- style="background:#cfc;"
| 57 || February 10 || Ottawa Senators || 6–3 || || Andersen (27–15–4) || Air Canada Centre || 19,477 || 33–19–5 || 71 ||Recap
|- style="background:#cfc;"
| 58 || February 12 || Tampa Bay Lightning || 4–3 || || Andersen (28–15–4) || Air Canada Centre || 19,112 || 34–19–5 || 73 || Recap
|- style="background:#cfc;"
| 59 || February 14 || Columbus Blue Jackets || 6–3 || || Andersen (29–15–4) || Air Canada Centre || 18,890 || 35–19–5 || 75 || Recap
|- style="background:#fcc;"
| 60 || February 17 || @ Pittsburgh Penguins || 3–5 || || Andersen (29–16–4) || PPG Paints Arena || 18,647 || 35–20–5 || 75 || Recap
|- style="background:#cfc;"
| 61 || February 18 || @ Detroit Red Wings || 3–2 || || McElhinney (7–4–0) || Little Caesars Arena || 19,515 || 36–20–5 || 77 || Recap
|- style="background:#cfc;"
| 62 || February 20 || Florida Panthers || 1–0 || || Andersen (30–16–4) || Air Canada Centre || 18,961 || 37–20–5 || 79 || Recap
|- style="background:#cfc;"
| 63 || February 22 || New York Islanders || 4–3 || SO || Andersen (31–16–4) || Air Canada Centre || 18,856 || 38–20–5 || 81 || Recap
|- style="background:#cfc;"
| 64 || February 24 || Boston Bruins || 4–3 || || Andersen (32–16–4) || Air Canada Centre || 19,370 || 39–20–5 || 83 || Recap
|- style="background:#ffc;"
| 65 || February 26 || @ Tampa Bay Lightning || 3–4 || SO || Andersen (32–16–5) || Amalie Arena || 19,092 || 39–20–6 || 84 || Recap
|- style="background:#ffc;"
| 66 || February 27 || @ Florida Panthers || 2–3 || OT || McElhinney (7–4–1) || BB&T Center || 14,265 || 39–20–7 || 85 || Recap
|-

|- style="background:#fcc;"
| 67 || March 3 || @ Washington Capitals || 2–5 || || Andersen (32–17–5) || Navy–Marine Corps Memorial Stadium || 29,516(outdoors) || 39–21–7 || 85 || Recap
|- style="background:#fcc;"
| 68 || March 5 || @ Buffalo Sabres || 3–5 || || Andersen (32–18–5) || KeyBank Center || 18,705 || 39–22–7 || 85 || Recap
|- style="background:#cfc;"
| 69 || March 10 || Pittsburgh Penguins || 5–2 || || Andersen (33–18–5) || Air Canada Centre || 19,504 || 40–22–7 || 87 || Recap
|- style="background:#cfc;"
| 70 || March 14 || Dallas Stars || 6–5 || SO || McElhinney (8–4–1) || Air Canada Centre || 18,918 || 41–22–7 || 89 || Recap
|- style="background:#cfc;"
| 71 || March 15 || @ Buffalo Sabres || 5–2 || || McElhinney (9–4–1) || KeyBank Center || 19,070 || 42–22–7 || 91 || Recap
|- style="background:#cfc;"
| 72 || March 17 || Montreal Canadiens || 4–0 || || McElhinney (10–4–1) || Air Canada Centre || 19,364 || 43–22–7 || 93 || Recap
|- style="background:#fcc;"
| 73 || March 20 || @ Tampa Bay Lightning || 3–4 || || Andersen (33–19–5) || Amalie Arena || 19,092 || 43–23–7 || 93 || Recap
|- style="background:#cfc;"
| 74 || March 22 || @ Nashville Predators || 5–2 || || Andersen (34–19–5) || Bridgestone Arena || 17,550 || 44–23–7 || 95 || Recap
|- style="background:#cfc;"
| 75 || March 24 || Detroit Red Wings || 4–3 || || Andersen (35–19–5) || Air Canada Centre || 19,154 || 45–23–7 || 97 || Recap
|- style="background:#fcc;"
| 76 || March 26 || Buffalo Sabres || 2–3 || || Andersen (35–20–5) || Air Canada Centre || 19,108 || 45–24–7 || 97 || Recap
|- style="background:#cfc;"
| 77 || March 28 || Florida Panthers || 4–3 || || Andersen (36–20–5) || Air Canada Centre || 18,893 || 46–24–7 || 99 || Recap
|- style="background:#cfc;"
| 78 || March 30 || @ New York Islanders|| 5–4 || || Andersen (37–20–5) || Barclays Center || 13,018 || 47–24–7 || 101 || Recap
|- style="background:#fcc;"
| 79 || March 31 || Winnipeg Jets|| 1–3 || || McElhinney (10–5–1) || Air Canada Centre || 19,101 || 47–25–7 || 101 || Recap
|-

|- style="background:#cfc;"
| 80 || April 2 || Buffalo Sabres || 5–2 || || McElhinney (11–5–1) || Air Canada Centre || 18,846 || 48–25–7 || 103 || Recap
|- style="background:#fcc;"
| 81 || April 5 || @ New Jersey Devils || 1–2 || || Andersen (37–21–5) || Prudential Center || 16,514 || 48–26–7 || 103 || Recap
|- style="background:#cfc;"
| 82 || April 7 || Montreal Canadiens || 4–2 || || Andersen (38–21–5) || Air Canada Centre || 19,525 || 49–26–7 || 105 || Recap
|-

|-
| 2017–18 schedule

Overtime statistics

Playoffs

|- style="background:#fcc;"
| 1 || April 12 || @ Boston Bruins || 1–5 ||  || Andersen (0–1) || TD Garden || 17,565 || 0–1 || Recap
|- style="background:#fcc;"
| 2 || April 14 || @ Boston Bruins || 3–7 ||  || McElhinney (0–1) || TD Garden || 17,565 || 0–2 || Recap
|- style="background:#cfc;"
| 3 || April 16 || Boston Bruins || 4–2 ||  || Andersen (1–1) || Air Canada Centre || 19,663 || 1–2 || Recap
|- style="background:#fcc;"
| 4 || April 19 || Boston Bruins || 1–3 ||  || Andersen (1–2) || Air Canada Centre || 19,689 || 1–3 || Recap
|- style="background:#cfc;"
| 5 || April 21 || @ Boston Bruins || 4–3 ||  || Andersen (2–2) || TD Garden || 17,565 || 2–3 || Recap
|- style="background:#cfc;"
| 6 || April 23 || Boston Bruins || 3–1 ||  || Andersen (3–2) || Air Canada Centre || 19,604 || 3–3 || Recap
|- style="background:#fcc;"
| 7 || April 25 || @ Boston Bruins || 4–7 ||  || Andersen (3–3) || TD Garden || 17,565 || 3–4 || Recap
|-

|-
|

Player statistics
Updated to game played April 25, 2018.
Skaters

Goaltenders

(a) Player currently playing for the minor league affiliate Toronto Marlies of the AHL 
(b) Player is no longer with the Leafs organization

Awards and honours

Awards

Transactions

Trades

Notes:
  Montreal to retain 50% of salary as part of trade.

Free agents acquired

Free agents lost

Claimed via waivers

Lost via waivers

Lost via expansion draft

Lost via retirement

Player signings

Draft picks

Below are the Toronto Maple Leafs' selections at the 2017 NHL Entry Draft, which was held on June 23–24, 2017 at the United Center in Chicago, Illinois. The Leafs held on to five of their own seven picks, having traded away their second round pick to the Tampa Bay Lightning in exchange for Brian Boyle, and losing their third round pick as compensation for signing head coach Mike Babcock. They also acquired an additional two picks through various trades.

Draft notes:
 The Ottawa Senators' second-round pick went the Toronto Maple Leafs as the result of a trade on February 9, 2016, that sent Dion Phaneuf, Matt Frattin, Casey Bailey, Ryan Rupert and Cody Donaghey to Ottawa in exchange for Milan Michalek, Jared Cowen, Colin Greening, Tobias Lindberg and this pick.
 The Pittsburgh Penguins' fourth-round pick went to the Toronto Maple Leafs as the result of a trade on March 1, 2017, that sent Frank Corrado to Pittsburgh in exchange for Eric Fehr, Steven Oleksy and this pick.

References

Toronto Maple Leafs seasons
Toronto Maple Leafs
Toronto
2017 in Toronto
2018 in Toronto